John Berry ( – ) was an English colonist who migrated from Barbados to become an early major landowner, militia officer and Deputy Governor under the Lords Proprietor of the Proprietary Colony of New Jersey.

Career
Soon after British annexation of the Dutch province of New Netherland in 1664, Philip Carteret, governor of the proprietary colony of New Jersey, granted land to Captain John Berry in the area formerly known as Achter Kol. He soon took up residence and called it "New Barbadoes," having previously resided on the island of Barbados. The land patent encompassed area between the Hackensack River and Saddle River in what is now Bergen County, New Jersey.

From 1672 to 1673, Berry was the Deputy Governor of the Province of New Jersey while Governor Philip Carteret was in England.

He later served in the East New Jersey Provincial Council through 1692. On 22 March 1679/80, Carteret designated Berry to succeed him as governor, with Councillor William Sandford designated to succeed Berry in the event of his inability to serve.

Personal life
Berry was married to Francina, with whom he had at least five children, including: Richard, Francina, Sarah, Hannah, John Berry.

Legacy
He is recalled in the name of a stream in the New Jersey Meadowlands, Berrys Creek, his descendants owned the historic Yereance-Berry House.

References
Notes

Sources

17th-century births
1710s deaths
Year of birth uncertain
Year of birth unknown
Year of death uncertain
Year of death unknown
People of British North America
Colonial governors of New Jersey
Lieutenant Governors of New Jersey
Members of the East New Jersey Provincial Council
People from Bergen County, New Jersey